Pieter Keijzer (born 10 April 1949 in Amsterdam) is a sailor from the Netherlands, who represented his country at the 1976 Summer Olympics in Kingston, Canada. With helmsman Geert Bakker and fellow crew member Harald de Vlaming Keijzer took the 5th place in the Soling. Pieter later specialized as helmsman in the Dragon, racing together with Ab Ekels and Harald de Vlaming.

Pieter Keijzer was head of the Dutch Olympic Sailing Team for the 2008 Summer Olympics and is past president of the Koninklijke Nederlandsche Zeil en Roei Vereeniging.

Sources
 
 
 
 
 
 
 
 

Living people
1949 births
Sportspeople from Amsterdam
Dutch male sailors (sport)

Sailors at the 1976 Summer Olympics – Soling
Dragon class sailors
Olympic sailors of the Netherlands
20th-century Dutch people